Ørestad station is a junction station served by both the Copenhagen Metro and regional trains in Copenhagen, Denmark. The penultimate stop of the M1 Line, it is located in zone 3 in the west-central section of the island of Amager.

Location
Ørestad station is one of the southernmost stations of the Copenhagen Metro system. Specifically, it lies on a viaduct paralleling the eastern edge of Ørestads Boulevard at its intersection with Arne Jacobsens Allé.

Transit-oriented development
One of six Metro stations within the Ørestad redevelopment area, significant mixed-use development and construction is underway  in the area immediately surrounding the station. As the transfer point between the Metro and regional trains, Ørestad station and its environs, termed the Ørestad City district, will see the most intense levels of development, with a focus a new Ørestad Downtown.

Surrounding Field's is the Ørestad Downtown, which include  of commercial space. Much of the Downtown was designed by Daniel Liebeskind. Ørestad station's residential transit-oriented development is scattered in the form of smaller apartment complexes, including City Husene, Parkhusene, and Sejlhuset.

History
The railway station opened in 2000. The Metro station opened in 2002.

References

External links
Ørestad Metro station on www.m.dk 
Ørestad Metro station on www.m.dk 
Ørestad Railway station on www.dsb.dk 

M1 (Copenhagen Metro) stations
Railway stations in Copenhagen
Railway stations opened in 2000
Railway stations opened in 2002
Øresund Line
2000 establishments in Denmark
2002 establishments in Denmark
Railway stations in Denmark opened in the 21st century